The Gunfight at Dodge City is a 1959 DeLuxe Color Western CinemaScope film. It was produced by the Mirisch Company, directed by Joseph M. Newman, co-written by Martin Goldsmith and Daniel B. Ullman and starred Joel McCrea as Bat Masterson.

Plot summary
Bat Masterson sells his saloon to his friend Ben Townsend in order to make money hunting buffalo with Ben's young, disabled brother Billy. A psychotic gunman named Dave Rudabaugh warns Bat that he shouldn't sell his pelts in Hays City. Bat ignores him to come to town where he outdraws a cavalry sergeant making him travel to Dodge City where his brother Ed is the City Marshal.

The upright Ed complains that the County Sheriff Jim Regan is corrupt and destroys his efforts to clean up the town. Ed is in love with Pauline Howard, the daughter of a church minister, but has delayed his marriage for unknown reasons. In the meantime, Bat enters a partnership with Lily, the proprietress of the Lady Gay saloon who faces ruin as the Sheriff and his deputies are attempting to force them out of business by first murdering her original partner, than frightening off her croupiers. Bat battles the Sheriff and his deputies, but after they murder his brother he becomes the City Marshal and has to choose between Pauline and Lily.

Cast
 Joel McCrea as Bat Masterson
 Julie Adams as Pauline Howard
 John McIntire as Doc Sam Tremaine
 Nancy Gates as Lily, Lady Gay Saloon Owner
 Richard Anderson as Dave Rudabaugh
 James Westerfield as Reverend Howard
 Walter Coy as Ben Townsend
 Don Haggerty as Sheriff Jim Regan of Dodge City
 Wright King as Billy Townsend
 Harry Lauter as City Marshal Ed Masterson

Production
Following the success of the Mirisch Productions Joel McCrea Western Wichita (1955), Walter Mirisch decided to make another Western with McCrea.  Originally entitled The Bat Masterson Story, Mirisch retitled the film The Gunfight at Dodge City to emulate the success of Gunfight at the O.K. Corral (1957).

References

External links
 
 
 
 

1959 films
1959 Western (genre) films
Films set in Kansas
United Artists films
CinemaScope films
American Western (genre) films
Films directed by Joseph M. Newman
Films produced by Walter Mirisch
Films scored by Hans J. Salter
Cultural depictions of Bat Masterson
1950s English-language films
1950s American films